Minnesota State Highway 42 (MN 42) is a  highway in southeast Minnesota, which runs from its interchange with Interstate 90 near Eyota and continues north and northeast to its northern terminus at its intersection with U.S. Highway 61 in Kellogg.

Route description
State Highway 42 serves as a north–south route between Eyota, Elgin, Plainview, and Kellogg in southeast Minnesota.

The route is also known as Wabasha Street in Plainview and 2nd Avenue in Elgin.

Highway 42 passes through the Richard J. Dorer State Forest between Plainview and Kellogg in Wabasha County.

Carley State Park is located four miles south of the junction of Highway 42 and Wabasha County Road 4 at Plainview.  The park entrance is located on Wabasha County Road 4.

History
State Highway 42 was authorized in 1920 between Eyota and Kellogg.  The route was completely paved by 1940.  Highway 42 was on its current alignment by 1953.

Highway 42 was extended south of Eyota to Interstate Highway 90 in 2002.

From 1934 to 2002, the southern terminus of Highway 42 was located at its intersection with U.S. Highway 14 on the northern edge of Eyota.

Major intersections

References

042
Transportation in Olmsted County, Minnesota
Transportation in Wabasha County, Minnesota